The Solar Wings Breeze is a British high-wing, single-place, hang glider that was designed and produced by Solar Wings of Manton, Wiltshire starting in 1996. Now out of production, when it was available the aircraft was supplied complete and ready-to-fly.

Design and development
The Breeze was designed as an easy to fly intermediate glider. It is made from aluminum tubing, with the double-surface wing covered in Dacron sailcloth. Its  span wing is cable braced from a single kingpost.

The Breeze was only produced in one size and was BHPA certified.

Specifications (Breeze)

References

Breeze
Hang gliders